Nysa  ( or Neiße) is a city in southwestern Poland on the Eastern Neisse (Polish: Nysa Kłodzka) river, situated in the Opole Voivodeship. With 43,849 inhabitants (2019), it is the capital of Nysa County. It comprises the urban portion of the surrounding Gmina Nysa. Historically the city was part of Upper Silesia.

History 

Nysa, one of the oldest towns in Silesia, was probably founded in the 10th century. The name of the Nysa river, from which the town takes its name, was mentioned in 991, when the region formed part of the Duchy of Poland under Mieszko I of Poland. A Polish stronghold was built in Nysa in the 11th and 12th century due to the proximity of the border with the Czech Duchy. As a result of the fragmentation of Poland, it became part of the Duchy of Silesia, and from the 14th century it functioned as the capital of the Duchy of Nysa, administered by the Bishopric of Wrocław. In the 12th century the Gothic Basilica of St. James and St. Agnes was built (later rebuilt after the war devastations of the 13th and 14th centuries). Now designated a Historic Monument of Poland, it is the most distinctive and most valuable landmark of Nysa. Nysa was granted town rights around 1223 by bishop Lawrence, confirmed by Duke Bolesław II Rogatka of Legnica in 1250, and attracted Flemish and German settlers. In 1241 it was ravaged by the Mongols during the first Mongol invasion of Poland. In 1245, it was granted staple right and two yearly fairs were established. In the early-14th century Nysa became an important trade- and craft-center of Poland, before it passed under the suzerainty of the Bohemian Crown in 1351, under which it remained until 1742. It also became one of the leading cultural centers of Silesia.

The town's fortifications, dating from 1350, served to defend against the Hussites in 1424. One of the prominent signs that Nysa was a significant center is the report in Nuremberg Chronicle, published in 1493, which mentions the city among the major urban centers of Central and Eastern Europe. In the description of the town population included in this chronicle we read "plebs rustica polonici ydeomatis ...". The Nysa coat of arms at the entrance of the Charles Bridge in Prague, which is displayed alongside the arms of the most prominent Bohemian cities, also indicates the importance of the town. In the 16th century it was a Polish printing center.

During the Thirty Years' War (1618–1648) Nysa was besieged three times. It was plundered by the Saxons and Swedes. Polish prince (and later King) Władysław IV Vasa visited the town several times between 1619 and 1638. In 1624 the Kolegium Carolinum Neisse (today's I Liceum Ogólnokształcące), one of the most renowned schools of Silesia, was established as a Jesuit college. Polish King Michał Korybut Wiśniowiecki and Polish prince James Louis Sobieski both attended this school.

During the First Silesian War (War of the Austrian Succession), in 1741, Nysa was besieged and captured by Prussians, King Frederick II of Prussia laid the foundations of its modern fortifications. In 1758, during the Seven Years' War, it was besieged by the Austrians. On 25 August 1769 it was the site of a meeting between Frederick II and Emperor Joseph II, co-regent in the Habsburg monarchy of Austria.

During the Napoleonic Wars Neisse was taken by the French in 1807. It retained its mostly Catholic character within the predominantly Protestant province of Silesia in the Kingdom of Prussia. Because of its many churches from the Gothic and Baroque periods the town was nicknamed "the Silesian Rome". In 1816–1911, the town was the seat of the Neisse District, after which it became an independent city. According to the Prussian census of 1910, the city of Neisse had a population of 25,938, of whom around 95% spoke German, 4% spoke Polish and 1% were bilingual.

During World War I and the post-war Polish Silesian Uprising, a prisoner-of-war camp was located in the town. Charles de Gaulle, future leader of French Resistance against German occupation in World War II and later president of France, was imprisoned there in 1916. After World War I, Neisse became part of the new Province of Upper Silesia within Weimar Germany.

During World War II the Germans established a subcamp of the Gross-Rosen concentration camp, three forced-labour camps, and several working parties of the Stalag VIII-B/344 prisoner-of-war camp at Łambinowice. Conquered by the Red Army in the last months of the war, the town was placed preliminarily under Polish administration in accordance with the Potsdam Agreement and renamed to the Polish Nysa. The town's German population was partly evacuated. After the German defeat, and following the preliminary establishment of the Oder-Neisse line as the new German-Polish border, the remaining German population of Nysa was expelled. Expulsions started in mid-June 1945, carried out by the Soviet-organized Polish militia who surrounded settlements, entered homes, and asked their inhabitants to leave their home with them.

In the following years, new Polish settlers, some whom were themselves expelled or resettled from what is now Western Ukraine (see: Kresy), made Nysa their new home.

Nysa's monuments

As a result of destruction during World War II, in particular the heavy fighting of the Vistula–Oder Offensive of early 1945, during which the Red Army pushed the German Army Group A out of southwest Poland, the historic aspect of the town has only partially been preserved. The most important monuments have been rebuilt. A list of the monuments of Nysa is seen on the page Nysa's monuments.

Polish troops were stationed in Nysa until 2001, when they were relocated to Kłodzko.

Economy

Until recently, Nysa was a major industrial centre in the Opole Voivodeship. The town was home to metal works, machinery production, agricultural produce and construction materials. The year 2002 saw the closure of the ZSD company. The company constructed delivery vehicles, namely the ZSD Nysa, FSO Polonez and, until recently, the Citroën C15 and Berlingo. Currently, the factory remains closed.

Recently, the Wałbrzych Special Economic Zone is located by Dubois Street (ul. Dubois) and Krapacka Street (ul. Krapacka), largely revolving around agricultural goods and produce, as well as metal works.

Sports
 Stal Nysa SA – men's volleyball team playing in Polish Volleyball League (Polska Liga Siatkówki, PLS), new in 2020 season
 KŻ Nysa –  sailing club with seat on Nysa's lake
 AZS PWSZ Nysa – students club of AZS
 Polonia Nysa – football club
 Podzamcze Nysa – football club
 AZS Basket Nysa – basketball club
 NTSK Nysa – women's volleyball club
 Fort Nysa – rugby and Australian rules football club
NTG Nysa – gymnastics club

Notable people

 Konrad Emil Bloch (1912–2000), German-American biochemist, Nobel Prize winner
 Emanuel Sperner (1905–1980), German mathematician
 Marcin Bors (born 1978), Polish record producer
 Hans-Joachim Caesar, Reichsbank director, German bank comptroller in occupied France, 1940–44
 Emanuel Oscar Menahem Deutsch (1829–1873), scholar on the Middle East
 Paweł Franczak (born 1991), Polish cyclist
 Rudolf Fränkel (1901–1974), architect 
 Sigismund Freyer (1881–1944), German horse rider
 Piotr Gacek (born 1978), Polish volleyball player
 Bernhard Grzimek (1909–1987), zoologist and conservationist
 Wilhelm Hasse (1894–1945), Wehrmacht general
 Martin Helwig (1516–1574), cartographer
 Max Herrmann-Neisse (1886–1941) German poet 
 Max Hodann (1894–1946), German physician
 Carl Hoffmann (1885–1947), German cinematographer and film director
 Jakub Jarosz (born 1987), Polish volleyball player
 Valentin Krautwald (1465–1545), German religious reformer
 Bartosz Kurek (born 1988), Polish volleyball player
 Adam Kurek (born 1968), Polish volleyball player
 Edmund Lesser (1852–1918), German dermatologist  
 Maria Merkert (1817–1872), founder of the Congregation of Saint Elizabeth
 Kurt von Morgen (1858–1928), Prussian explorer and officer 
 Hans Guido Mutke (1921–2004), fighter pilot
 Emin Pasha (Eduard Schnitzer) (1840–1892), physician and Ottoman governor of Equatoria
 Karl-Georg Saebisch (1903–1984), German actor
 Friedrich von Sallet (1812–1843), German satirical writer
 Solomon Schindler (1842–1915), rabbi
 Franz Skutsch (1865–1912), German classical philologist and linguist 
 Ryszard Wasko (born 1947), Polish artist
 Max Ernst Wichura (1817–1866), German lawyer and botanist
 Arnold von Winckler (1856–1945), Prussian general
 Roman Wójcicki (born 1958), Polish footballer
 Krzysztof Wójcik (born 1960), Polish volleyball player

Other residents
 Isidor Barndt
 Nicolaus Copernicus
 Joseph Freiherr von Eichendorff
 Karl Rudolph Friedenthal
 Eduard von Grützner
 Franz Ludwig von Pfalz-Neuburg
 Christoph Scheiner
 Friedrich Wilhelm von Steuben
 Wacker von Wackenfels

Twin towns – sister cities
See twin towns of Gmina Nysa.

See also

 Archdiocese of Wrocław
 Dukes of Silesia
 Nysa's monuments

References

"NEISSE BUCH DER ERINNERUNG", Dr. Max Warmbrunn & Alfred Jahn, Gedruckt bei Druckhaus Nürnberg GmbH, 1966

External links
 Map c1600 Neis(s)e in Silesia, Germany
 Jewish Community in Nysa on Virtual Shtetl

Cities in Silesia
Cities and towns in Opole Voivodeship
Nysa
1223 establishments in Europe
13th-century establishments in Poland